Blisworth Football Club is a football club based in Blisworth, near Northampton, in Northamptonshire, England.

History
The club was formed in 1898 as Blisworth Football Club. The club joined the United Counties League Division Three in 1970. After two seasons, the division was renamed Division Two. After spending eight years in the United Counties League, Blisworth dropped back to local football. They re-joined the United Counties League in Division One in 1987, and remained there until resigning in 2006. Their highest league position was third placing in 1987–88.

After resigning, Blisworth entered the Northamptonshire Football Combination. They were promoted to the Premier Division after finishing as runners-up in Division One in 2011–12.

The following season the club reached the final of the Premier Division cup after a 1–0 win over Brixworth to reach the final for the first time since 1985.

Although unknown at the time the 2014/2015 season turned out to be the foundations for future success as Manager Broadbent made some shrewd summer signings to bolster his existing squad of young talent. Although narrowly missing out on League success to Corby Eagles and losing in the Semi final of the Junior cup to United Counties League winners Northampton Spencer there were signs that success wasn't too far in the distance.

The 2015/16 season saw Blisworth take a stronghold of the Premier league and take the title comfortably. With all of the existing players deciding to re-sign for Broadbent Blisworth only required to make minimal inclusions for the 2016/17 season.

The 2016/17 season will be forever remembered by all involved at JK Blisworth as the squad under the continued guidance of Simon Broadbent completed an amazing treble. The first trophy was claimed on the last day of the domestic league season as the League Champions reclaimed their status. This was shortly followed up by the assignation of league rivals Kettering Nomads in the Premier League Cup final. Such was the domination in the 5-0 victory confidence was high a week later when under the floodlights at Northampton Town FC Blisworth shocked their UCL rivals Raunds Town with an injury time winner by Dale Lewis in the Junior Cup Final. Blisworth's feat was an historic achievement as they were the first ever Northamptonshire Combination team to win the trophy.

Honours
Northamptonshire Football Combination Premier Division
Runners-up: 2014-15
Winners: 2015–16
Winners: 2016-17
Winners: 2017-18
Winners: 2018-19
Northamptonshire Football Combination Division One
Runners-up: 2011-12
Winners: 2018-19 (Reserves)
Premier Division Cup
Winners: 2013–14
Winners: 2016-17
Winners: 2018-19
Northamptonshire Junior Cup
Winners: 2016-17
Runners-up: 2018-19

References

External links

Football clubs in England
Football clubs in Northamptonshire
Association football clubs established in 1898
1898 establishments in England
Northamptonshire Combination Football League
Works association football teams in England